Lutibacter oricola is a Gram-negative, aerobic, rod-shaped and non-motile bacterium from the genus of Lutibacter which has been isolated from seawater from Seo-do from the Dokdo Island.

References

Flavobacteria
Bacteria described in 2015